Qays Ghanem (born 31 December 1997) is an Israeli professional footballer who plays as a forward for Israeli Premier League club Hapoel Tel Aviv.

Club career
On 7 June 2022 signed for Israeli Premier League club Hapoel Tel Aviv.

Honours
 Hapoel Be'er Sheva
Israel State Cup: 2019–20, 2021–22

References

1997 births
Living people
Israeli footballers
Hapoel Nir Ramat HaSharon F.C. players
Hapoel Ra'anana A.F.C. players
Hapoel Be'er Sheva F.C. players
Hapoel Haifa F.C. players
Hapoel Tel Aviv F.C. players
Israeli Premier League players
Liga Leumit players
Footballers from Central District (Israel)
Israel youth international footballers
Association football forwards
Arab-Israeli footballers
Arab citizens of Israel
Israeli Muslims